The Sail Area-Displacement ratio (SA/D) is a calculation used to express how much sail a boat carries relative to its weight.

In the first equation, the denominator in pounds is divided by 64 to convert it to cubic feet (because 1 cubic foot of salt water weights 64 pounds). The denominator is taken to the 2/3 power to make the entire metric unit-less (without this, the denominator is in cubic feet, and the numerator is in square feet).

It is an indicator of the performance of a boat. The higher the SA/D, the more lively the boat's sailing performance:

SA/D, however, doesn't provide information about a boat behavior in a storm or upwind. A polar diagram from a velocity prediction program gives a more precise view.

See also 
 Displacement–length ratio

References

Ship measurements
Nautical terminology
Engineering ratios
Naval architecture